Bay Springs Lake is a reservoir on the Tennessee-Tombigbee Waterway 
in the U.S. state of Mississippi.  It is impounded by the Jamie Whitten Lock and Dam.  The lake is approximately nine miles long, between waterway mile markers 412 at the dam, and 421 near the entrance to the divide cut.

External links 
   from USACE.

Protected areas of Prentiss County, Mississippi
Reservoirs in Mississippi
Protected areas of Tishomingo County, Mississippi
Bodies of water of Prentiss County, Mississippi
Bodies of water of Tishomingo County, Mississippi